Reggae is a music genre that originated in Jamaica in the late 1960s. The term also denotes the modern popular music of Jamaica and its diaspora. A 1968 single by Toots and the Maytals, "Do the Reggay", was the first popular song to use the word reggae, effectively naming the genre and introducing it to a global audience. While sometimes used in a broad sense to refer to most types of popular Jamaican dance music, the term reggae more properly denotes a particular music style that was strongly influenced by traditional mento as well as American jazz and rhythm and blues, and evolved out of the earlier genres ska and rocksteady. Reggae usually relates news, social gossip, and political commentary. It is instantly recognizable from the counterpoint between the bass and drum downbeat and the offbeat rhythm section. The immediate origins of reggae were in ska and rocksteady; from the latter, reggae took over the use of the bass as a percussion instrument.

Reggae is deeply linked to Rastafari, an Afrocentric religion which developed in Jamaica in the 1930s, aiming at promoting pan-Africanism. Soon after the Rastafarian movement appeared, the international popularity of reggae music became associated with and increased the visibility of Rastafari and spread its gospel throughout the world. Reggae music is an important means of transporting vital messages of Rastafari. The musician becomes the messenger, and as Rastafari see it, "the soldier and the musician are tools for change."

Stylistically, reggae incorporates some of the musical elements of rhythm and blues, jazz, mento (a celebratory, rural folk form that served its largely rural audience as dance music and an alternative to the hymns and adapted chanteys of local church singing), calypso, and also draws influence from traditional African folk rhythms. One of the most easily recognizable elements is offbeat rhythms; staccato chords played by a guitar or piano (or both) on the offbeats of the measure. The tempo of reggae is usually slower paced than both ska and rocksteady. The concept of call and response can be found throughout reggae music. The genre of reggae music is led by the drum and bass. Some key players in this sound are Jackie Jackson from Toots and the Maytals, Carlton Barrett from Bob Marley and the Wailers, Lloyd Brevett from the Skatalites, Paul Douglas from Toots and the Maytals, Lloyd Knibb from the Skatalites, Winston Grennan, Sly Dunbar, and Anthony "Benbow" Creary from the Upsetters. The bass guitar often plays the dominant role in reggae. The bass sound in reggae is thick and heavy, and equalized so the upper frequencies are removed and the lower frequencies emphasized. The guitar in reggae usually plays on the offbeat of the rhythm.  It is common for reggae to be sung in Jamaican Patois, Jamaican English, and Iyaric dialects. Reggae is noted for its tradition of social criticism and religion in its lyrics, although many reggae songs discuss lighter, more personal subjects, such as love and socializing.

Reggae has spread to many countries around the world, often incorporating local instruments and fusing with other genres. Reggae en Español spread from the Spanish-speaking Central American country of Panama to the mainland South American countries of Venezuela and Guyana then to the rest of South America. Caribbean music in the United Kingdom, including reggae, has been popular since the late 1960s, and has evolved into several subgenres and fusions. Many reggae artists began their careers in the UK, and there have been a number of European artists and bands drawing their inspiration directly from Jamaica and the Caribbean community in Europe. Reggae in Africa was boosted by the visit of Bob Marley to Zimbabwe in 1980. In Jamaica, authentic reggae is one of the biggest sources of income.

Etymology
The 1967 edition of the Dictionary of Jamaican English lists reggae as "a recently estab. sp. for rege", as in rege-rege, a word that can mean either "rags, ragged clothing" or "a quarrel, a row". Reggae as a musical term first appeared in print with the 1968 rocksteady hit "Do the Reggay" by the Maytals which named the genre.

Reggae historian Steve Barrow credits Clancy Eccles with altering the Jamaican patois word  streggae (loose woman) into reggae. However, Toots Hibbert said:
There's a word we used to use in Jamaica called "streggae". If a girl is walking and the guys look at her and say "Man, she's streggae" it means she don't dress well, she look raggedy. The girls would say that about the men too. This one morning me and my two friends were playing and I said, "OK man, let's do the reggay." It was just something that came out of my mouth. So we just start singing "Do the reggay, do the reggay" and created a beat. People tell me later that we had given the sound its name. Before that people had called it blue-beat and all kind of other things. Now it's in the Guinness World of Records.

Bob Marley claimed that the word reggae came from a Spanish term for "the king's music". The liner notes of To the King, a compilation of Christian gospel reggae, suggest that the word reggae was derived from the Latin  meaning 'to the king'.

History

Precursors

Reggae's direct origins are in the ska and rocksteady of 1960s Jamaica, strongly influenced by traditional Caribbean mento and calypso music, as well as American jazz and rhythm and blues. Ska was originally a generic title for Jamaican music recorded between 1961 and 1967 and emerged from Jamaican R&B, which was based largely on American R&B and doo-wop. Rastafari entered some countries primarily through reggae music; thus, the movement in these places is more stamped by its origins in reggae music and social milieu. The Rastafari movement was a significant influence on reggae, with Rasta drummers like Count Ossie taking part in seminal recordings. One of the predecessors of reggae drumming is the Nyabinghi rhythm, a style of ritual drumming performed as a communal meditative practice in the Rastafarian life.

In the latter half of the 20th century, phonograph records became of central importance to the Jamaican music industry, playing a significant cultural and economic role in the development of reggae music. "In the early 1950s, Jamaican entrepreneurs began issuing 78s" but this format would soon be superseded by the 7" single, first released in 1949. In 1951 the first recordings of mento music were released as singles and showcased two styles of mento: an acoustic rural style, and a jazzy pop style. Other 7" singles to appear in Jamaica around this time were covers of popular American R&B hits, made by Kingston sound system operators to be played at public dances. Meanwhile, Jamaican expatriates started issuing 45s on small independent labels in the United Kingdom, many mastered directly from Jamaican 45s.

Ska arose in Jamaican studios in the late 1950s, developing from this mix of American R&B, mento and calypso music. Notable for its jazz-influenced horn riffs, ska is characterized by a quarter note walking bass line, guitar and piano offbeats, and a drum pattern with cross-stick snare and bass drum on the backbeat and open hi-hat on the offbeats. When Jamaica gained independence in 1962, ska became the music of choice for young Jamaicans seeking music that was their own. Ska also became popular among mods in Britain.

In the mid-1960s, ska gave rise to rocksteady, a genre slower than ska featuring more romantic lyrics and less prominent horns. Theories abound as to why Jamaican musicians slowed the ska tempo to create rocksteady; one is that the singer Hopeton Lewis was unable to sing his hit song "Take It Easy" at a ska tempo. The name "rocksteady" was codified after the release of a single by Alton Ellis. Many rocksteady rhythms later were used as the basis of reggae recordings, whose slower tempos allowed for the "double skank" guitar strokes on the offbeat.

Emergence in Jamaica
Reggae developed from ska and rocksteady in the late 1960s. Larry And Alvin's "Nanny Goat" and the Beltones' "No More Heartaches" were among the songs in the genre. The beat was distinctive from rocksteady in that it dropped any of the pretensions to the smooth, soulful sound that characterized slick American R&B, and instead was closer in kinship to US southern funk, being heavily dependent on the rhythm section to drive it along. Reggae's great advantage was its almost limitless flexibility: from the early, jerky sound of Lee Perry's "People Funny Boy", to the uptown sounds of Third World's "Now That We’ve Found Love", it was an enormous leap through the years and styles, yet both are instantly recognizable as reggae.  The shift from rocksteady to reggae was illustrated by the organ shuffle pioneered by Jamaican musicians like Jackie Mittoo and Winston Wright and featured in transitional singles "Say What You're Saying" (1968) by Eric "Monty" Morris and "People Funny Boy" (1968) by Lee "Scratch" Perry.
 

Early 1968 was when the first bona fide reggae records were released: "Nanny Goat" by Larry Marshall and "No More Heartaches" by the Beltones. That same year, the newest Jamaican sound began to spawn big-name imitators in other countries. American artist Johnny Nash's 1968 hit "Hold Me Tight" has been credited with first putting reggae in the American listener charts. Around the same time, reggae influences were starting to surface in rock and pop music, one example being 1968's "Ob-La-Di, Ob-La-Da" by the Beatles.

The Wailers, a band started by Bob Marley, Peter Tosh and Bunny Wailer in 1963, is perhaps the most recognized band that made the transition through all three stages of early Jamaican popular music: ska, rocksteady and reggae. Over a dozen Wailers songs are based on or use a line from Jamaican mento songs. Other significant ska artists who made the leap to reggae include Prince Buster, Desmond Dekker, Ken Boothe, and Millie Small, best known for her 1964 blue-beat/ska cover version of "My Boy Lollipop" which was a smash hit internationally.

Notable Jamaican producers influential in the development of ska into rocksteady and reggae include: Coxsone Dodd, Lee "Scratch" Perry, Leslie Kong, Duke Reid, Joe Gibbs and King Tubby. Chris Blackwell, who founded Island Records in Jamaica in 1960, relocated to England in 1962, where he continued to promote Jamaican music. He formed a partnership with Lee Gopthal's Trojan Records in 1968, which released reggae in the UK until bought by Saga records in 1974.

International popularity

Reggae's influence bubbled to the top of the U.S. Billboard Hot 100 charts in late 1972. First Three Dog Night hit No. 1 in September with a cover of the Maytones' version of "Black and White". Then Johnny Nash was at No. 1 for four weeks in November with "I Can See Clearly Now". Paul Simon's single "Mother And Child Reunion" – a track which he recorded in Kingston, Jamaica with Jimmy Cliff's backing group – was ranked by Billboard as the No. 57 song of 1972.

In 1973, the film The Harder They Come starring Jimmy Cliff was released and introduced Jamaican music to cinema audiences outside Jamaica. Though the film achieved cult status its limited appeal meant that it had a smaller impact than Eric Clapton's 1974 cover of Bob Marley's "I Shot the Sheriff" which made it onto the playlists of mainstream rock and pop radio stations worldwide. Clapton's "I Shot the Sheriff" used modern rock production and recording techniques and faithfully retained most of the original reggae elements; it was a breakthrough pastiche devoid of any parody and played an important part in bringing the music of Bob Marley to a wider rock audience. By the mid-1970s, authentic reggae dub plates and specials were getting some exposure in the UK on John Peel's radio show, who promoted the genre for the rest of his career. Around the same time, British filmmaker Jeremy Marre documented the Jamaican music scene in Roots Rock Reggae, capturing the heyday of Roots reggae.

While the quality of Reggae records produced in Jamaica took a turn for the worse following the oil crisis of the 1970s, reggae produced elsewhere began to flourish. In the late 1970s and early 1980s, the UK punk rock scene flourished, and reggae was a notable influence. The DJ Don Letts would play reggae and punk tracks at clubs such as The Roxy. Punk bands such as the Clash, the Ruts, the Members and the Slits played many reggae-influenced songs. Around the same time, reggae music took a new path in the UK; one that was created by the multiracial makeup of England's inner cities and exemplified by groups like Steel Pulse, Aswad and UB40, as well as artists such as Smiley Culture and Carroll Thompson. The Jamaican ghetto themes in the lyrics were replaced with UK inner city themes, and Jamaican patois became intermingled with Cockney slang. In South London around this time, a new subgenre of lovers rock, was being created. Unlike the Jamaican music of the same name which was mainly dominated by male artists such as Gregory Isaacs, the South London genre was led by female singers like Thompson and Janet Kay. The UK Lovers Rock had a softer and more commercial sound.Other reggae artists who enjoyed international appeal in the early 1980s include Third World, Black Uhuru and Sugar Minott. The Grammy Awards introduced the Grammy Award for Best Reggae Album category in 1985.

Women also play a role in the reggae music industry personnel such as Olivia Grange, president of Specs-Shang Musik; Trish Farrell, president of Island/Jamaica; Lisa Cortes, president of Loose Cannon; Jamaican-American Sharon Gordon, who has worked in the independent reggae music industry.

Reggae heritage 

Jamaican Prime Minister Bruce Golding made February 2008 the first annual Reggae Month in Jamaica. To celebrate, the Recording Industry Association of Jamaica (RIAJam) held its first Reggae Academy Awards on 24 February 2008. In addition, Reggae Month included a six-day Global Reggae conference, a reggae film festival, two radio station award functions, and a concert tribute to the late Dennis Brown, who Bob Marley cited as his favorite singer. On the business side, RIAJam held events focused on reggae's employment opportunities and potential international revenue. . Reggae Month 2019 in Jamaica was welcomed with multiple events ranging from corporate reggae functions to major celebrations in honour of Bob Marley's Birthday on 6 February to a tribute concert in honour of Dennis Brown on 24 February along with a sold-out concert by 2019 Reggae Grammy nominated artiste Protoje for his A Matter of Time Live held at Hope Gardens in Kingston on 23 February.

In November 2018 "reggae music of Jamaica" was added to the UNESCO's Representative List of the Intangible Cultural Heritage of Humanity the decision recognised reggae's "contribution to international discourse on issues of injustice, resistance, love and humanity underscores the dynamics of the element as being at once cerebral, socio-political, sensual and spiritual."

Musical characteristics

Stylistically, reggae incorporates some of the musical elements of rhythm and blues (R&B), jazz, mento, calypso, African, and Latin American music, as well as other genres. Reggae scenes consist of two guitars, one for rhythm and one for lead—drums, congas, and keyboards, with a couple of vocalists.

One of the most easily recognizable elements is offbeat rhythms; staccato chords played by a guitar or piano (or both) on the offbeats of the measure, often referred to as the skank.

This rhythmic pattern accents the second and fourth beats in each bar and combines with the drum's emphasis on beat three to create a unique sense of phrasing. The reggae offbeat can be counted so that it falls between each count as an "and" (example: 1 and 2 and 3 and 4 and, etc.) or counted as a half-time feel at twice the tempo so it falls on beats 2 and 4. This is in contrast to the way most other popular genres focus on beat one, the "downbeat".

The tempo of reggae is usually slower than both ska and rocksteady. It is this slower tempo, the guitar/piano offbeats, the emphasis on the third beat, and the use of syncopated, melodic bass lines that differentiate reggae from other music, although other musical styles have incorporated some of these innovations.

Drums and other percussion
A standard drum kit is generally used in reggae, but the snare drum is often tuned very high to give it a timbales-type sound. Some reggae drummers use an additional timbale or high-tuned snare to get this sound.  Cross-stick technique on the snare drum is commonly used, and tom-tom drums are often incorporated into the drumbeat itself.

Reggae drumbeats fall into three main categories: One drop, Rockers, and Steppers. With the One drop, the emphasis is entirely on the backbeat (usually on the snare, or as a side-stick combined with bass drum). Beat one is empty except for a closed high hat commonly used, which is unusual in popular music. There is some controversy about whether reggae should be counted so that this beat falls on two and four, or whether it should be counted twice as fast, so it falls on three. An example played by Barrett can be heard in the Bob Marley and the Wailers song "One Drop". Barrett often used an unusual triplet cross-rhythm on the hi-hat, which can be heard on many recordings by Bob Marley and the Wailers, such as "Running Away" on the Kaya album.

An emphasis on the backbeat is found in all reggae drumbeats, but with the Rockers beat, the emphasis is on all four beats of the bar (usually on bass drum). This beat was pioneered by Sly and Robbie, who later helped create the "Rub-a-Dub" sound that greatly influenced dancehall. Sly has stated he was influenced to create this style by listening to American drummer Earl Young as well as other disco and R&B drummers in the early to mid-1970s, as stated in the book "Wailing Blues". The prototypical example of the style is found in Sly Dunbar's drumming on "Right Time" by the Mighty Diamonds. The Rockers beat is not always straightforward, and various syncopations are often included. An example of this is the Black Uhuru song "Sponji Reggae".

In Steppers, the bass drum plays every quarter beat of the bar, giving the beat an insistent drive. An example is "Exodus" by Bob Marley and the Wailers. Another common name for the Steppers beat is the "four on the floor". Burning Spear's 1975 song "Red, Gold, and Green" (with Leroy Wallace on drums) is one of the earliest examples. The Steppers beat was adopted (at a much higher tempo) by some two-tone ska revival bands of the late 1970s and early 1980s.

An unusual characteristic of reggae drumming is that the drum fills often do not end with a climactic cymbal. A wide range of other percussion instrumentation are used in reggae. Bongos are often used to play free, improvised patterns, with heavy use of African-style cross-rhythms. Cowbells, claves and shakers tend to have more defined roles and a set pattern.

Reggae drummers often involved these three tips for other reggae performers: (1) go for open, ringing tones when playing ska and rocksteady, (2) use any available material to stuff the bass drum so that it tightens up the kick to a deep, punchy thud, and (3) go without a ride cymbal, focusing on the hi-hat for timekeeping and thin crashes with fast decay for accents.

Bass

The bass guitar often plays the dominant role in reggae, and the drum and bass is often the most important part of what is called, in Jamaican music, a riddim (rhythm), a (usually simple) piece of music that is used repeatedly by different artists to write and record songs with. Hundreds of reggae singers have released different songs recorded over the same rhythm. The central role of the bass can be particularly heard in dub music – which gives an even bigger role to the drum and bass line, reducing the vocals and other instruments to peripheral roles.

The bass sound in reggae is thick and heavy, and equalized so the upper frequencies are removed and the lower frequencies emphasized. The bass line is often a repeated two or four bar riff when simple chord progressions are used. The simplest example of this might be Robbie Shakespeare's bass line for the Black Uhuru hit "Shine Eye Gal". In the case of more complex harmonic structures, such as John Holt's version of "Stranger in Love", these simpler patterns are altered to follow the chord progression either by directly moving the pattern around or by changing some of the interior notes in the phrase to better support the chords.

Guitars

The guitar in reggae usually plays on the off beat of the rhythm. So if one is counting in  time and counting "1 and 2 and 3 and 4 and ...", one would play a downstroke on the "and" part of the beat. A musical figure known as skank or the 'bang" has a very dampened, short and scratchy chop sound, almost like a percussion instrument. Sometimes a double chop is used when the guitar still plays the off beats, but also plays the following eighth-note beats on the up-stroke. An example is the intro to "Stir It Up" by the Wailers. Artist and producer Derrick Harriott says, "What happened was the musical thing was real widespread, but only among a certain sort of people. It was always a down-town thing, but more than just hearing the music. The equipment was so powerful and the vibe so strong that we feel it."

Keyboards
From the earliest days of ska recordings, a piano was used to double the rhythm guitar's skank, playing the chords in a staccato style to add body, and playing occasional extra beats, runs and riffs. The piano part was widely taken over by synthesizers during the 1980s, although synthesizers have been used in a peripheral role since the 1970s to play incidental melodies and countermelodies. Larger bands may include either an additional keyboardist, to cover or replace horn and melody lines, or the main keyboardist filling these roles on two or more keyboards.

The reggae organ-shuffle is unique to reggae. In the original version of reggae, the drummer played a reggae groove that was used in the four bar introduction, allowing the piano to serve as a percussion instrument. Typically, a Hammond organ-style sound is used to play chords with a choppy feel. This is known as the bubble. This may be the most difficult reggae keyboard rhythm. The organ bubble can be broken down into two basic patterns. In the first, the eighth beats are played with a space-left-right-left-space-left-right-left pattern, where the spaces represent downbeats not played—that and the left-right-left falls on the ee-and-a, or and-2-and if counted at double time. In the second basic pattern, the left hand plays a double chop as described in the guitar section while the right hand plays longer notes on beat 2 (or beat 3 if counted at double time) or a syncopated pattern between the double chops. Both these patterns can be expanded on and improvised embellishments are sometimes used.

Horns
Horn sections are frequently used in reggae, often playing introductions and countermelodies. Instruments included in a typical reggae horn section include saxophone, trumpet or trombone. In more recent times, real horns are sometimes replaced in reggae by synthesizers or recorded samples. The horn section is often arranged around the first horn, playing a simple melody or counter melody. The first horn is usually accompanied by the second horn playing the same melodic phrase in unison, one octave higher. The third horn usually plays the melody an octave and a fifth higher than the first horn. The horns are generally played fairly softly, usually resulting in a soothing sound. However, sometimes punchier, louder phrases are played for a more up-tempo and aggressive sound.

Vocals

The vocals in reggae are less of a defining characteristic of the genre than the instrumentation and rhythm, as almost any song can be performed in a reggae style. However, it is very common for reggae to be sung in Jamaican Patois, Jamaican English, and Iyaric dialects. Vocal harmony parts are often used, either throughout the melody (as with vocal groups such as the Mighty Diamonds), or as a counterpoint to the main vocal line (as with the backing vocalists, the I-Threes). More complex vocal arrangements can be found in the works of groups like the Abyssinians and British reggae band Steel Pulse.

An unusual aspect of reggae singing is that many singers use tremolo (volume oscillation) rather than vibrato (pitch oscillation). Notable exponents of this technique include Horace Andy and vocal group Israel Vibration. The toasting vocal style is unique to reggae, originating when DJs improvised spoken introductions to songs (or "toasts") to the point where it became a distinct rhythmic vocal style, and is generally considered to be a precursor to rap. It differs from rap mainly in that it is generally melodic, while rap is generally more a spoken form without melodic content.

Lyrical themes
Reggae is noted for its tradition of social criticism in its lyrics, although many reggae songs discuss lighter, more personal subjects, such as love and socializing. Many early reggae bands covered Motown or Atlantic soul and funk songs. Some reggae lyrics attempt to raise the political consciousness of the audience, such as by criticizing materialism, or by informing the listener about controversial subjects such as apartheid. Many reggae songs promote the use of cannabis (also known as herb, ganja, or sinsemilla), considered a sacrament in the Rastafari movement. There are many artists who utilize religious themes in their music – whether it be discussing a specific religious topic, or simply giving praise to God (Jah). Other common socio-political topics in reggae songs include black nationalism, anti-racism, anti-colonialism, anti-capitalism and criticism of political systems and "Babylon".

In recent years, Jamaican (and non-Jamaican) reggae musicians have used more positive themes in reggae music. The music is widely considered a treasured cultural export for Jamaica, so musicians who still desire progress for their island nation have begun focusing on themes of hopefulness, faith, and love. For elementary children, reggae songs such as "Give a Little Love", "One Love", or "Three Little Birds", all written by Bob Marley, can be sung and enjoyed for their optimism and cheerful lyrics.

Criticism of dancehall and reggae lyrics

Some dancehall and ragga artists have been criticised for homophobia, including threats of violence. Buju Banton's song "Boom Bye-Bye" states that gays "haffi dead". Other notable dancehall artists who have been accused of homophobia include Elephant Man, Bounty Killer and Beenie Man. The controversy surrounding anti-gay lyrics has led to the cancellation of UK tours by Beenie Man and Sizzla. Toronto, Canada has also seen the cancellation of concerts due to artists such as Elephant Man and Sizzla refusing to conform to similar censorship pressures.

After lobbying from the Stop Murder Music coalition, the dancehall music industry agreed in 2005 to stop releasing songs that promote hatred and violence against gay people. In June 2007, Beenie Man, Sizzla and Capleton signed up to the Reggae Compassionate Act, in a deal brokered with top dancehall promoters and Stop Murder Music activists. They renounced homophobia and agreed to "not make statements or perform songs that incite hatred or violence against anyone from any community". Five artists targeted by the anti-homophobia campaign did not sign up to the act, including Elephant Man, TOK, Bounty Killa and Vybz Kartel. Buju Banton and Beenie Man both gained positive press coverage around the world for publicly renouncing homophobia by signing the Reggae Compassion Act. However, both of these artists have since denied any involvement in anti-homophobia work and both deny having signed any such act.

Global significance

Reggae has spread to many countries around the world, often incorporating local instruments and fusing with other genres. In November 2018 UNESCO added the "reggae music of Jamaica" to the Representative List of the Intangible Cultural Heritage of Humanity.

Americas

Reggae en Español spread from mainland South American Caribbean from Venezuela and Guyana to the rest of South America.  It does not have any specific characteristics other than being sung in Spanish, usually by artists of Latin American origin. Samba reggae originated in Brazil as a blend of samba with Jamaican reggae. Reggae also has a presence in Veracruz, Mexico. The most notable Jarocho reggae group being Los Aguas Aguas from Xalapa. Some of the most popular reggae groups across Latin America come from the Southern Cone, such as the Chilean band Gondwana, and the Argentinian band Los Cafres. The Puerto Rican band Cultura Profética is also widely recognized in the region. Hispanic reggae includes three elements: the incorporation of the Spanish language; the use of translations and versions based on known riddims and background music; and regional consciousness. It is a medium of rebellious contestation rising from the underground. Hispanic reggae is related to rap, sharing characteristics that can be found not only in the social conditions in which they developed in the region but also in the characteristics of social sectors and classes that welcome them.

Brazilian samba-reggae utilized themes such as the civil rights movement and the Black Soul movement, and especially the Jamaican independence movement since the 1960s and its messages in reggae and Rastafari. Thus, the sudden popularity of reggae music and musicians in Bahia, Brazil, was not the result of the effects of the transnational music industry, but of the need to establish cultural and political links with black communities across the Americas that had faced and were facing similar sociopolitical situations.

Musically, it was the bloco afro Olodum and its lead percussionist, Neguinho do Samba, that began to combine the basic samba beat of the blocos with merengue, salsa, and reggae rhythms and debuted their experimentations in the carnival of 1986. The new  (drumming patterns) were labeled "samba-reggae" and consisted basically of a pattern in which the surdo bass drums (four of them at minimum) divided themselves into four or five interlocking parts.

In the state of Maranhão, in northeastern Brazil, reggae is a very popular genre. São Luís, the state capital, is known as the Brazilian Jamaica. The city has more than 200 , the name given to sound teams formed by DJs and sound systems with dozens of powerful amplifiers stacked. Reggae in Maranhão has its own characteristics, such as melody and dance style, as well as having its own radio and television programs. In 2018, the Reggae Museum of Maranhão was inaugurated, the second reggae museum in the world (after Jamaica), with the objective of preserving the state's reggae cultural history.

In the United States, bands like Rebelution, Slightly Stoopid, Stick Figure, and SOJA are considered progressive reggae bands sometimes referred to as Cali Reggae or Pacific Dub. The American reggae scene is heavily centred in Southern California, with large scenes also in New York City, Washington, D.C., Chicago, Miami, and Honolulu. For decades, Hawaiian reggae has had a big following on the Hawaiian islands and the West coast of the US. On the east coast upstate NY has seen a rise in original roots reggae bands such as Giant Panda Guerilla Dub Squad and John Brown's Body who were inspired by Jamaican reggae bands that performed in the area in the 1980s and 1990s. Matisyahu gained prominence by blending traditional Jewish themes with reggae. Compounding his use of the hazzan style, Matisyahu's lyrics are mostly English with more than occasional use of Hebrew and Yiddish. There is a large Caribbean presence in Toronto and Montreal, Canada, with English and French influences on the reggae genre. Canadian band Magic!'s 2013 single "Rude" was an international hit.

In 2017, Toots and the Maytals became the second reggae-based group to ever perform at the Coachella festival, after Chronixx in 2016.

Europe
The UK was a primary destination for Caribbean people looking to emigrate as early as the 1950s. Because of this, Caribbean music in the United Kingdom, including reggae, has been popular since the late 1960s, and has evolved into several subgenres and fusions. Most notable of these is lovers rock, but this fusion of Jamaican music into English culture was seminal in the formation of other musical forms like drum and bass and dubstep. The UK became the base from which many Jamaican artists toured Europe and due to the large number of Jamaican musicians emigrating there, the UK is the root of the larger European scene that exists today. Many of the world's most famous reggae artists began their careers in UK. Singer and Grammy Award-winning reggae artist Maxi Priest began his career with seminal British sound system Saxon Studio International.

Three reggae-tinged singles from the Police's 1978 debut album, Outlandos d'Amour, laid down the template for the basic structure of a lot of rock/reggae songwriting: a reggae-infused verse containing upstrokes on guitar or keyboards and a more aggressive, on-the-beat punk/rock attack during the chorus. The end of the 1970s featured a ska revival in the UK. By the end of the 1970s, a revival movement had begun in England, with such bands as the Specials, Madness, the (English) Beat, and the Selecter. The Specials' leader and keyboardist, Jerry Dammers, founded the 2 Tone record label, which released albums from the aforementioned racially integrated groups and was instrumental in creating a new social and cultural awareness. The 2 Tone movement referenced reggae's godfathers, popular styles (including the genre's faster and more dance-oriented precursors, ska and rocksteady), and previous modes of dress (such as black suits and porkpie hats) but updated the sound with a faster tempo, more guitar, and more attitude.

Birmingham based reggae/pop music band UB40 were main contributors to the British reggae scene throughout the 1980s and 1990s. The achieved international success with hits such as "Red Red Wine", "Kingston Town" and "(I Can't Help) Falling in Love with You."

Other UK-based artists that had international impact include Aswad, Misty in Roots, Steel Pulse, Janet Kay, Tippa Irie, Smiley Culture and more recently Bitty McLean. There have been a number of European artists and bands drawing their inspiration directly from Jamaica and the Caribbean community in Europe, whose music and vocal styles are almost identical to contemporary Jamaican music. The best examples might be Alborosie (Italy) and Gentleman (Germany). Both Gentleman and Alborosie have had a significant chart impact in Jamaica, unlike many European artists. They have both recorded and released music in Jamaica for Jamaican labels and producers and are popular artists, likely to appear on many riddims. Alborosie has lived in Jamaica since the late 1990s and has recorded at Bob Marley's famous Tuff Gong Studios. Since the early 1990s, several Italian reggae bands have emerged, including Africa Unite, Gaudi, Reggae National Tickets, Sud Sound System, Pitura Freska and B.R. Stylers.

Reggae appeared on the Yugoslav popular music scene in the late 1970s, through sporadic songs by various rock acts, most prominently by new wave bands Haustor, Šarlo Akrobata, Aerodrom, Laboratorija Zvuka, Piloti, Zana and Du Du A. In the mid-1980s appeared Del Arno Band, often considered the first Yugoslav band whose sound was primarily reggae-oriented, remaining one of the most notable reggae acts on the post-Yugoslav music scene.

The first homegrown Polish reggae bands started in the 1980s with groups like Izrael. Singer and songwriter Alexander Barykin was considered the father of Russian reggae. In Sweden, Uppsala Reggae Festival attracts attendees from across Northern Europe and features Swedish reggae bands such as Rootvälta and Svenska Akademien as well as many popular Jamaican artists. Summerjam, Europe's biggest reggae festival, takes place in Cologne, Germany, and sees crowds of 25,000 or more. Rototom Sunsplash, a week-long festival which used to take place in Osoppo, Italy, until 2009, is now held in Benicassim, Spain, and gathers up to 150,000 visitors every year.

In Iceland reggae band Hjálmar is well established having released six CDs in Iceland. They were the first reggae band in Iceland, but few Icelandic artists had written songs in the reggae style before their arrival on the Icelandic music scene. The Icelandic reggae scene is expanding and growing at a fast rate. RVK Soundsystem is the first Icelandic sound system, counting five DJs. They hold reggae nights in Reykjavík every month at clubs Hemmi og Valdi and more recently in Faktorý as the crowd has grown so much.

In Germany, the three successful Reggae Summerjam open-air festivals were crucial parts of the renaissance of Caribbean music in Germany but in 1990, conflict broke out between the two main German promoters who had cooperated so well during the previous seasons. With a lot of infighting and personal quarrels, each of them pursued his own preparations for a big summer festival. The result was that two open-air events look place on the same day.

The 1990 Reggae Summerjam was staged as usual, but for only one day. The event took place at the Lorelei Rock amphitheater, with artists like Mad Professor's Ariwa Posse with Macka B and Kofi, Mutabaruka, the Mighty Diamonds, the Twinkle Brothers, Manu Dibango and Fela Kuti.

The other, ex-partner of the once-united promoters succeeded in bringing the original Sunsplash package to Germany for the first time. Close to the Main River in the little village of Gemaunden deep in rural south-central Germany, they staged a two-day festival that drew a bigger crowd. About 10,000 people came from all over the country as well as from neighboring states like trance and, for the first time, East Germany to see the lineup of top reggae artists.

Africa
Reggae in Africa was much boosted by the visit of Bob Marley to Zimbabwe on Independence Day 18 April 1980. Nigerian reggae had developed in the 1970s with artists such as Majek Fashek proving popular.  In South Africa, reggae music has played a unifying role amongst cultural groups in Cape Town. During the years of Apartheid, the music bonded people from all demographic groups. Lucky Dube recorded 25 albums, fusing reggae with Mbaqanga. The Marcus Garvey Rasta camp in Phillipi is regarded by many to be the reggae and Rastafari center of Cape Town. Reggae bands play regularly at community centres such as the Zolani center in Nyanga.

In Uganda musician Papa Cidy is very popular. Arthur Lutta is also a Ugandan gospel reggae drummer known for his reggae style drumming. In Ethiopia, Dub Colossus and Invisible System emerged in 2008 sharing core members, and have received wide acclaim. In Mali, Askia Modibo fuses reggae with Malian music. In Malawi, Black Missionaries produced nine albums. In Ivory Coast a country where reggae music is extremely popular, Tiken Jah Fakoly fuses reggae with traditional music. Alpha Blondy from Ivory Coast sings reggae with religious lyrics. In Sudan, beats, drums and bass guitar from reggae have been adopted by local music. Reggae is very popular there among generations from young to old; some spiritual (religious) groups grow dreadlocks and feature reggae beats in their chants.

Asia
In the Philippines, several bands and sound systems play reggae and dancehall music. Their music is called Pinoy reggae. Japanese reggae emerged in the early 1980s. Reggae is becoming more prevalent in Thailand as well. Reggae music is quite popular in Sri Lanka. Aside from the reggae music and Rastafari influences seen ever more on Thailand's islands and beaches, a true reggae sub-culture is taking root in Thailand's cities and towns. Many Thai artists, such as Job 2 Do, keep the tradition of reggae music and ideals alive in Thailand.

Famous Indian singer Kailash Kher and music producer Clinton Cerejo created Kalapi, a rare fusion piece of reggae and Indian music for Coke Studio India. Other than this high-profile piece, reggae is confined to a small, emerging scene in India. Thaikkudam Bridge, a neo-Indian band based in Kerala, India, is known for introducing reggae into Indian regional blues.

Australia and the Pacific
Reggae in Australia originated in the 1980s. Australian reggae groups include Sticky Fingers, Blue King Brown and Astronomy Class.

By the end of the 1980s, the local music scene in Hawaii was dominated by Jawaiian music, a local form of reggae.

New Zealand reggae was heavily inspired by Bob Marley's 1979 tour of the country and early reggae groups such as Herbs. The genre has seen many bands like Fat Freddy's Drop, Salmonella Dub, the Black Seeds and Katchafire emerging in more recent times, often involving fusion with electronica.

In 2017 the first-ever chart dedicated to reggae and dancehall music was established in Australia by radio presenter DJ Ragz, music producer DJ Wade and Dancehall Reggae Australia.

Cod reggae
The term cod reggae is popularly used to describe reggae done by non-Caribbean people, often in a disparaging manner because of perceived inauthenticity. Boy George has been described as one of the "greats" in cod reggae.

See also

 List of dub artists
 List of reggae compilation albums
 Reggae festivals
 Reggae genres
 Cannabis
 Rastafari
 Skinhead
 Skanking

References

Bibliography
 Jérémie Kroubo Dagnini (2008). Les origines du reggae: retour aux sources. Mento, ska, rocksteady, early reggae, L'Harmattan, coll. Univers musical.  
 Jérémie Kroubo Dagnini (2011). Vibrations jamaïcaines. L'Histoire des musiques populaires jamaïcaines au XXe siècle, Camion Blanc.

Further reading
 Bradley, Lloyd (1996). Reggae on CD: The Essential Collection. London: Kyle-Cathie. 368 p. . The ISBN is from the back cover; the ISBN on the verso of the t.p. is incomplete.
 Smith, Horane. Reggae Silver  Bedside Books. 2004. https://www.jamaicaobserver.com/art-culture/bookends-feb-05-2012page-one-inside-checking-in-with-horane-smithpage-twobookshelfchecking-in-with-horane-smith/

 
Jamaican styles of music
Intangible Cultural Heritage of Humanity
1960s in music